The Shrine of Our Lady of Europe (Lombard: Santüari de la Madòna d'Europa) is a Roman Catholic shrine at Campodolcino, Lombardy, Italy. It is devoted to Our Lady of Europe (Lombard: Madòna d'Europa) and is currently the headquarters of the European Ecumenical Centre for Peace.

History
During the late 1950s, Catholic sectors felt that the Europeist movements would need a Catholic dimension and thought of placing Europe under the protection of the Blessed Virgin Mary. However, they were unaware that such a devotion was already in existence, albeit at a local level, in the British territory of Gibraltar (where the original Shrine devoted to Our Lady still exists to this day) and to a lesser extent in some neighbouring locations in Spain. The movement, supported by the Archbishop of Milan, decided to place a statue in the region of the Italian Alps, which marks the hydrological centre of Europe, since it was the watershed separating the basins of the rivers Rhine, Danube and Po.

The monument was blessed by the Archbishop of Milan Giovanni Montini (later Pope Paul VI) on 14 September 1958.

Statue
It is a gilt bronze statue, which was sculptured by Egidio Casagrande taking inspiration from the Shroud of Turin. The statue rests on a circular structure atop a sanctuary with an altar below. The structure weighs .

References

Sanctuary of Our Lady of Europe (in Italian)

Churches in the province of Sondrio
Shrines to the Virgin Mary
Our Lady of Europe
Province of Sondrio
20th-century Roman Catholic church buildings in Italy